ANIPLUS is an Asian multinational television channel and anime distributor based in Singapore and South Korea. Launched on 7 December 2009, the channel is currently available on SK Broadband, LG Uplus IPTV service, and KT SkyLife. The company also has a video on demand platform in its own country. Most of its programming are licensed from its parent company JJ MediaWorks for subtitling and dubbing distribution.

Aniplus mostly aired anime simultaneously with Japanese airings.

Aniplus Asia

Aniplus Asia is an East and Southeast Asian anime pay television channel and anime distributor based in Singapore. It is a sister channel of Aniplus. Founded on 25 November 2013, it is available in various countries in the Asia-Pacific region, including (aside from Singapore), Hong Kong, Indonesia and Thailand.

History
The channel was first launched in March 2014 on Singaporean pay-TV provider Singtel TV. In August 2015, it partnered with OTT platform iflix to distribute 21 of their titles via its VOD service. In June 2016, ANIPLUS Asia started to be distributed in Thailand on free-to-air channel Now26 as a programming block, thanks to a partnership deal with Mediaplex International. In September, it was launched in Hong Kong on video streaming site Le.com. In November, it is picked up by streaming website Tribe in Indonesia, and it reaches the Philippines in December on that same platform.

In January 2017, ANIPLUS Asia partnered with Philippine free-to-air television channel TV5 to revive their ANiMEGA anime programming block. The block premiered with Attack on Titan: Junior High, Myriad Colors Phantom World and Kantai Collection, dubbed in Tagalog. In February, it is launched in Malaysia on satellite provider Astro. On May of that same year, it is picked up by Sky Cable in the Philippines. On May 25, 2018, ANIPLUS Asia was available on Easy TV Home in the Philippines, but has ceased operations since September 30, 2019. On April 1, 2021, ANIPLUS Asia ceased its transmission on Astro Go in Malaysia and Royal Cable in the Philippines after the contract had expired, although the channel was later reappeared on Royal Cable along with some other alternatives following the lack of channel lineups due to the closure of the Fox Networks Group channels. On February 2023, ANIPLUS Asia appeared on Unifi TV as Video on Demand channel, with the channel bundeled with its sister channel K+.

Programming 

The channel acquires content from various anime distributors such as Mighty Media and other distributors. It also licenses anime series and offers select titles to OTT platforms: Netflix, Bilibili, iQIYI and WeTV. The channel airs the notable anime series from Japan. Notable series include Attack on Titan, Psycho-Pass, The Promised Neverland, and Kantai Collection.

See also 
 List of programs broadcast by Aniplus Asia

References

External links
  (South Korea)
  (Singapore & Southeast Asia)
  (South Korea)
  (Singapore & Southeast Asia)

2009 establishments in South Korea
2013 establishments in Singapore
Anime television
Television channels and stations established in 2009
Television channels and stations established in 2013
Mass media in Singapore
Mass media companies of South Korea
Mass media in Southeast Asia
Television channels in South Korea
Television stations in Singapore